The discography of Irish new wave group The Boomtown Rats consists of seven studio albums, seven compilation albums, 23 singles and three video albums. The Boomtown Rats' debut release was the 1977 single "Lookin' After No. 1" which was originally written by frontman Bob Geldof in 1975 while waiting for his local unemployment office to open in his native Dun Laoghaire then a major port an hour south of central Dublin. The group's next single "Mary of the 4th Form" was released in the same year, along with their self-titled debut album.

Albums

Studio albums

Live albums

Compilation albums

EPs

Singles

Videography

Video albums

Music videos

References

External links
 
 

Boomtown Rats
Rock music group discographies
New wave discographies